Henriette Martinez (born July 10, 1949 in Laragne-Montéglin, Hautes-Alpes) was a member of the National Assembly of France.  She represented Hautes-Alpes' 1st constituency, as a member of the Rally for the Republic from 1993 to 1997 and again as a member of Union for a Popular Movement from 2002 to 2012.

References

1949 births
Living people
People from Hautes-Alpes
Rally for the Republic politicians
Union for a Popular Movement politicians
The Popular Right
Mayors of places in Provence-Alpes-Côte d'Azur
Women mayors of places in France
Deputies of the 12th National Assembly of the French Fifth Republic
Deputies of the 13th National Assembly of the French Fifth Republic
21st-century French women politicians
20th-century French women politicians